Robert Paul "Bob" Kraft (June 16, 1927 – May 26, 2015) was an American astronomer.  He performed pioneering work on Cepheid variables, stellar rotation, novae, and the chemical evolution of the Milky Way. His name is also associated with the Kraft break: the abrupt change in the average rotation rate of main sequence stars around spectral type F8.

Career
Kraft served as director of the Lick Observatory (1981–1991), president of the American Astronomical Society (1974–1976), and president of the International Astronomical Union (1997–2000).

He received his B.S. at the University of Washington in 1947, M.S. in mathematics at the University of Washington in 1949, and PhD from the University of California, Berkeley. He died in 2015.

Honors

Awards
Helen B. Warner Prize for Astronomy (1962)
Henry Norris Russell Lectureship (1995)
Bruce Medal (2005)
National Academy of Sciences

Named after him
Asteroid 3712 Kraft

References

Further reading

External links 
 
 Sandra Faber, "Robert P. Kraft", Biographical Memoirs of the National Academy of Sciences (2022)

1927 births
2015 deaths
Members of the United States National Academy of Sciences
20th-century American astronomers
21st-century American astronomers
Scientists from Seattle
University of Washington alumni
University of California, Berkeley alumni
Presidents of the International Astronomical Union